Pollicipora is a monotypic genus of bryozoans belonging to the monotypic family Polliciporidae. The only species is Pollicipora fucata.

References

Cheilostomatida
Bryozoan genera
Monotypic bryozoan genera
Endemic fauna of Chile